Iodocholesterol, or 19-iodocholesterol, also as iodocholesterol (131I) (INN) and NP-59, is a derivative of cholesterol with an iodine atom in the C19 position and a radiopharmaceutical. When the iodine atom is a radioactive isotope (iodine-125 or iodine-131), it is used as an adrenal cortex radiotracer in the diagnosis of patients suspected of having Cushing's syndrome, hyperaldosteronism, pheochromocytoma, and adrenal remnants following total adrenalectomy.

References

Cholestanes
Organoiodides
Radiopharmaceuticals